Phelipara mindanaonis is a species of beetle in the family Cerambycidae. It was described by Breuning in 1980.

References

Agapanthiini
Beetles described in 1980